Jack Koenig (born May 14, 1959, in Rockville Centre, New York) is an American actor best known for his work in theatre and television. He is most familiar to audiences for playing Michael Conway on Sex and The City, Dr. Levin in The Blacklist, Ronald Danzer in Gotham, Defense Attorney Swift in Law & Order, and Grant Ward in Madoff. For his work in the Off-Broadway production Tabletop, he was awarded the 2001 Drama Desk Award for Outstanding Ensemble Performance.

Early life 
Born in Rockville Centre and Raised in Baldwin, New York, Koenig attended Columbia University where he majored in English because the university did not offer an undergraduate degree in theatre at the time. Nevertheless, he studied with Estelle Parsons and Robert Neff Williams, whom Koenig credits as the best teacher he ever had. While enrolled at Columbia, he starred in the school's production of Macbeth as the eponymous character and as The Boy in The Fantasticks through a special arrangement with the Off-Broadway production which was then in its 17th year.

Career 
After graduating, Koenig began his acting career performing in regional theatre, appearing in Philocetetes at Delaware Theatre Company, A Quiet End with Jack Kenny at The Repertory Theatre of St. Louis, Rough Crossing – Tom Stoppard's adaptation of Ferenc Molnár's The Play's The Thing – at Westport Country Playhouse, and as a member of the first season of Michael Kahn's The Shakespeare Theatre in Mandragola. The following year he appeared in Julie Taymor's production of Taming of the Shrew for Theatre for a New Audience at North Shore Music Theatre, an episode of Monsters, and won three episodes of Jeopardy!.

Continuing to work Off-Broadway through the 1990s, he performed in a variety of productions including Grand Finale at Ubu Repertory Theatre, Herb Gardner's I'm With Ya Duke with David Margulies at Ensemble Studio Theatre, The Voysey Inheritance at The Mint, Misalliance and Cymbeline at Pearl Theatre, and John Guare's Marco Polo Sings a Solo with Bruce Norris and Polly Holliday at Signature Theatre Company, co-starred in My Girlfriend's Boyfriend with Deborah Gibson, Chris Bruno, and Valerie Perrine, appeared in I.Q. and The Proprietor, and guest-starred across television on Law & Order, The Cosby Mysteries, Now and Again, Sex and The City, and As The World Turns. Koenig's career began to kick off after winning the 2001 Drama Desk Award for Rob Ackerman's hit play, Tabletop, which was met with unanimous critical praise. Soon afterwards he appeared at Manhattan Theatre Club in Cary Churchill's Mad Forest and Richard Greenberg's The American Plan and Three Days of Rain – with Patricia Clarkson, John Slattery, and Bradley Whitford – in Richard Greenberg's Everett Beekin and A.R. Gurney's Big Bill at Lincoln Center, and as the young Charles Carrol in National Treasure.

The following year he made his Broadway premiere in The Lion King as Scar. His theatre work continued with acclaimed original runs in Dan Dietz's Clementine in the Lower 9, The Flag Maker of Market Street and Blood Divided at Alabama Shakespeare Festival, in revivals of David Mamet's Race, A Moon for the Misbegotten at Virginia Stage Company, Absurd Person Singular, The Christmas Story, Laughing Stock, A Doll's House, Heartbreak House, The Seagull, An Inspector Calls, Present Laughter, and a return to the Shakespeare Theatre to work with Michael Kahn again, 32 years after his debut, in Harold Pinter's The Collection. Off-Broadway his work has continued with The Actors Company Theatre in The Cocktail Party and Incident at Vichy, in staged readings at The Players Club with David Staller's Gingold Theatrical Group in The Apple Cart, Saint Joan, Caesar and Cleopatra, and In Good King Charles' Golden Days, in Perfect Crime with Catherine Russell, and in A.R. Gurney's The Grand Manner with Kate Burton at the Mitzi Newhouse Theatre. On Broadway he has performed in the Tony Award-winning play Oslo directed by Bartlett Sher, Accent on Youth with David Hyde Pierce, and The Pitmen Painters. Recently he joined the cast of Harry Potter and the Cursed Child; Parts One and Two on Broadway at The Lyric Theatre.

Koenig's television guest appearances have increased to include Law & Order as the recurring character Defense Attorney Swift, Law & Order SVU, and Law & Order: Criminal Intent, The Good Wife, Zero Hour, Forever, Unforgettable, Boardwalk Empire, Madoff, Power, Pose, Gotham, and The Blacklist.

Personal life 
Koenig has two children, a daughter and son. He lives in Manhattan.

Filmography

Film

Television

References

External links 
 
 
 

1959 births
Living people
American male film actors
American male stage actors
American male television actors
American male voice actors
American baritones
Columbia College (New York) alumni
Male actors from New York City
Actors from New York (state)
People from Rockville Centre, New York
20th-century American male actors
21st-century American male actors